Shahid Beheshti Air Base ( – Pādegān Hevāyī Shahīd Beheshtī) is a village and air force base in Jarahi Rural District, in the Central District of Mahshahr County, Khuzestan Province, Iran. At the 2006 census, its population was 367, in 115 families.

References 

Populated places in Mahshahr County
Military installations of Iran